Srđan Karanović (born 17 November 1945) is a Serbian film director and screenwriter. He has directed 17 films since 1968. His film Miris poljskog cveća won the FIPRESCI prize at the 1978 Cannes Film Festival, Nešto između was screened in the Un Certain Regard section at the 1983 Cannes Film Festival. A Film with No Name (Za Sada Bez Dobrog Naslova) won the Golden Tulip Award at the Istanbul International Film Festival in 1989.

His 2009 film Besa was selected as the Serbian entry for the Best Foreign Language Film at the 83rd Academy Awards, but it did not make the final shortlist. In 2017, Srđan Karanović has signed the Declaration on the Common Language of the Croats, Serbs, Bosniaks and Montenegrins.

Selected filmography

See also
 Praška filmska škola

References

External links

1945 births
Living people
Serbian film directors
Serbian screenwriters
Male screenwriters
Golden Arena for Best Director winners
Film people from Belgrade
Yugoslav film directors
Signatories of the Declaration on the Common Language